Sir John de Seton (d 4 August 1306) was a knight who took part in the War of Scottish Independence, as a supporter of Robert de Brus. He held lands in England and Scotland.

Seton was a son of Sir John de Seton of Skelton, Cumberland and Erminia Lascelles. His brothers were Christopher and Humphrey de Seton. This branch of the Seton family had long served the Bruces in Yorkshire, Cumberland and Scotland.

John performed fealty to King Edward I of England at Berwick on 28 August 1296. Seton was present on 10 February 1306 when Sir John Comyn, Lord of Badenoch was stabbed by Robert de Brus in Greyfriars Church, Dumfries. A letter of excommunication was issued naming the Robert de Brus, Earl of Carrick and three other knights, Sir Alexander Lindsay, Sir Christopher Seton and his brother, John as John Comyn's murderers. 

He was captured by English forces after the fall of Tibbers Castle in 1306. John was hanged and drawn at Newcastle-upon-Tyne on 4 August 1306. He was executed on the basis that he was a witness to the murder of John Comyn, Lord of Badenoch by Robert de Brus, Earl of Carrick at Dumfries and holding Tibbers Castle against Edward I. His lands in Cumnock, Ayrshire were given to Roger, son of Finlay, in a charter from Robert de Brus, where it mentions a brother and a son.

Citations

References
 

1306 deaths
Scottish people of the Wars of Scottish Independence
Executed Scottish people
People executed under the Plantagenets
Scottish knights
14th-century executions by England